The 1924 United States Senate election in New Hampshire was held on November 4, 1924.

Incumbent Republican Senator Henry W. Keyes was re-elected to a second term in office over Democratic state Treasurer George Farrand.

General election

Candidates
George E. Farrand, New Hampshire Treasurer (Democratic)
Henry Keyes, incumbent Senator since 1919 (Republican)

Results

References 

1924 United States Senate elections
1924 New Hampshire elections
United States Senate elections in New Hampshire